The Madison–Putnam–60th Place Historic District is a national historic district in Ridgewood, Queens, New York.  It includes 145 contributing buildings built between 1900 and 1920.  They consist mainly of brick two story row houses with one apartment per floor and three story tenements with two apartments per floor.  They feature brick facades and Romanesque Revival style detailing.  Also included in the district is the Old Queens Labor Lyceum.

It was listed on the National Register of Historic Places in 1983.

References

Romanesque Revival architecture in New York City
Ridgewood, Queens
Historic districts on the National Register of Historic Places in Queens, New York
Historic districts in Queens, New York